Euplica is a genus of sea snails, marine gastropod mollusks in the family Columbellidae, the dove snails.

Species
Species within the genus Euplica include :
 Euplica bidentata (Menke, 1843)
 Euplica borealis (Pilsbry, 1904)
 Euplica brunnidentata de Maintenon, 2008
 Euplica deshayesi (Crosse, 1859)
 Euplica festiva (Deshayes, 1834)
 Euplica ionida (Duclos, 1835)
 Euplica lipparinii Cossignani, 2005
 Euplica livescens (Reeve, 1859)
 Euplica loisae Rehder, 1980
 Euplica prellei Cossignani, 2005
 Euplica scripta (Lamarck, 1822)
 Euplica turturina (Lamarck, 1822)
 Euplica varians (G.B. Sowerby, 1832)
Species brought into synonymy
 Euplica reticulata Cossignani, 2005: synonym of Euplica festiva (Deshayes in Laborde & Linant, 1834)
 Euplica versicolor (G. B. Sowerby I, 1832): synonym of Euplica scripta (Lamarck, 1822)

References

External links
 Dall W.H. 1889. Reports on the results of dredging, under the supervision of Alexander Agassiz, in the Gulf of Mexico (1877-78) and in the Caribbean Sea (1879-80), by the U.S. Coast Survey Steamer "Blake", Lieut.-Commander C.D. Sigsbee, U.S.N., and Commander J.R. Bartlett, U.S.N., commanding. XXIX. Report on the Mollusca. Part 2, Gastropoda and Scaphopoda. Bulletin of the Museum of Comparative Zoölogy at Harvard College, 18: 1-492, pls. 10-40

Columbellidae